The 2015–16 The Citadel Bulldogs basketball team represented The Citadel, The Military College of South Carolina in the 2015–16 NCAA Division I men's basketball season.  The Bulldogs were led by first year head coach Duggar Baucom and played their home games at McAlister Field House. Baucom was previously the head coach at military rival VMI.  They again played as a member of the Southern Conference, as they have since 1936–37. They finished the season 10–22, 3–15 in SoCon play to finish in last place. They lost in the first round of the SoCon tournament to Mercer.

Preseason
With the hiring of Duggar Baucom as head coach, The Citadel adopted a more up-tempo style, similar to that which Baucom used at VMI.  This is in stark contrast to the slow, deliberate pace employed in recent seasons by previous coach Chuck Driesell.  A large turnover in personnel resulted, with several early commits deciding to go elsewhere, and several of Baucom's recruits at VMI following him to Charleston.  Baucom also landed two graduate students who transferred to The Citadel to play their final year of eligibility.

The Bulldogs were picked to finish 9th in the 10 team Southern Conference by both the media and coaches.

Departures
Aside from three seniors, The Citadel also lost freshman guard Jake Wright to transfer.  Coach Baucom landed two recruits, who signed National Letters of Intent on April 20, 2015.

Recruiting

Roster
P. J. Boutte was dismissed from the team for a violation of team rules just prior to the Bulldogs' appearance in the first round of the Southern Conference tournament.

Schedule

|-
! colspan=8 style=""|Exhibition

|-
! colspan=8 style=""|Regular season

|-
! colspan=8 style=""|

References

The Citadel Bulldogs basketball seasons
Citadel
Citadel Bulldogs bask
Citadel Bulldogs bask